Autism Research is a bimonthly peer-reviewed medical journal covering research on autism and other pervasive developmental disorders. It was established in 2008 and is the official journal of the International Society for Autism Research. It is published by Wiley-Blackwell and the editor-in-chief is Anthony J. Bailey (University of British Columbia).

According to the Journal Citation Reports, the journal has a 2013 impact factor of 4.532, ranking it 4th out of 65 journals in the category "Psychology, Developmental" and 5th out of 49 journals in the category "Behavioral Sciences".

Abstracting and indexing
The journal is abstracted and indexed in:
BIOSIS Previews 
Current Contents/Social & Behavioral Sciences 
Embase 
MEDLINE/PubMed 
PsycINFO/Psychological Abstracts
Science Citation Index Expanded 
Scopus 
Social Sciences Citation Index

References

External links

Psychiatry journals
Publications established in 2008
English-language journals
Wiley-Blackwell academic journals
Bimonthly journals